Stevan Dohanos (May 18, 1907 – July 4, 1994) was an American artist and illustrator of the social realism school, best known for his Saturday Evening Post covers, and responsible for several of the Don't Talk set of World War II propaganda posters. He named Grant Wood and Edward Hopper as the greatest influences on his painting.

Life

Dohanos was born in Lorain, Ohio and attended the Cleveland School of Art. He worked in fine art as well as in commercial art. 
In the 1930s he briefly experimented with lithography and wood etching. He was a member of the National Society of Mural Painters and the Society of Illustrators. He was a founding faculty member of the Famous Artists School of Westport, Connecticut.

Dohanos worked for the Section of Painting and Sculpture of the U.S. Treasury Department, painting several post office murals, including those for West Palm Beach and Charlotte Amalie.

His first magazine illustration was for McCall's in 1938. In the early 1940s, he moved to Westport, Connecticut, and in 1942 he sold his first cover painting to The Saturday Evening Post. Dohanos went on to paint over 125 Post covers during the 1940s and 1950s. He also illustrated for Esquire and other magazines.

In the 1960s he became chairman of the Citizens' Stamp Advisory Committee, which selected art to appear on United States postage stamps. He selected art for over 300 postage stamps during the administration of seven Presidents of the United States and nine Postmaster Generals.  In 1984, the Postal Service's Hall of Stamps in Washington was dedicated in his honor.

His easel paintings and prints have been displayed in the Cleveland Museum of Art, Whitney Museum of American Art, Pennsylvania Academy of the Fine Arts, and Dartmouth College. He was nationally known as an illustrator and magazine cover artist, particularly for his work appearing in The Saturday Evening Post.
He was a member of the Dutch Treat Club in New York City

See also
Barefoot Mailman

References

Sources
The United States Air Force Art Collection - Brief biography of Stevan Dohanos - URL retrieved November 8, 2005
Another brief biography of Stevan Dohanos - URL retrieved December 22, 2005

"Treasury Department Section of Painting and Sculpture"

Sources

Delaney, Arthur A "Social realism in WPA-era post office murals", Stamps, ISSN 0038-9358, 02/1995, Volume 250, Issue 9, p. 8
Park, Marlene, Democratic vistas : post offices and public art in the New Deal Philadelphia: Temple University Press, 1984. 
Siboroski, Paul Michael The production of art under the treasury section of fine arts during the new deal: six murals in the West Palm Beach Post Office by Stevan Dohanos, Federal Art Project, 1988

External links

Stevan Dohanos artwork can be viewed at American Art Archives web site
Stevan Dohanos posters, hosted by the University of North Texas Libraries Digital Collections
Stevan Dohanos tear sheets in the Charles Craver Collection at the Modern Graphic History Library
"Award for Careless Talk", Stevan Dohanos Museum of Modern Art
New Deal Art in Florida
The Pop History Dig: The U.S. Post Office, features several Saturday Everning Post covers by Dohanos
Society of Illustrators Hall of Fame inductee Stevan Dohanos
StevanDohanos.com Gallery of Original Art by Stevan Dohanos

Social realist artists
20th-century American painters
American male painters
American poster artists
People from Lorain, Ohio
Artists from Cleveland
People from Westport, Connecticut
1907 births
1994 deaths
Date of death missing
Painters from Ohio
American muralists
American engravers
American wood engravers
Section of Painting and Sculpture artists
American magazine illustrators
Cleveland School of Art alumni
20th-century American male artists
20th-century engravers